George Beluso Rimando (born February 2, 1953) is an auxiliary bishop of the Roman Catholic Archdiocese of Davao in the Philippines.

Rimando was ordained a priest on April 22, 1980.

On March 4, 2006, Pope Benedict XVI appointed him Auxiliary Bishop of Davao and Titular Bishop of Vada. He was consecrated bishop on May 25, 2006 by Fernando Capalla, Archbishop of Davao. Co-consecrators were Romulo Geolina Valles, Bishop of Kidapawan; and Wilfredo D. Manlapaz, Bishop of Tagum.

References

1953 births
Living people
Bishops appointed by Pope Benedict XVI
Filipino bishops
Roman Catholic bishops of Davao